Scoglio d'Africa Lighthouse is an active lighthouse located on a solitary skerry, Scoglio d'Africa, in open Tyrrhenian Sea halfway Montecristo and Pianosa.

Description
The light is operated by the Lighthouses Service of Marina Militare identified by the code number 2096 E.F.

See also
List of lighthouses in Italy

References

External links
 Servizio Fari Marina Militare 
 Gallery of the lighthouse

Lighthouses in Italy